Frederick Collingwood Liggins (5 June 1873 – 28 May 1926) was a New Zealand cricketer.

Liggins played eight first-class matches for Otago between 1896 and 1901. He was described as a "batsman of the steady and slow order". His highest score for Otago was the 25 he scored against the touring Australians in 1896-97 when Otago needed 82 in their second innings and were dismissed for 64.

He moved to Perth, Western Australia, where he was the manager of the Standard Fire and Marine Insurance Company of New Zealand. He served as the insurance companies' representative on the Perth Fire Brigades Board for 12 years before he died in May 1926 after a short illness.

See also
 List of Otago representative cricketers

References

External links
 

1873 births
1926 deaths
New Zealand cricketers
Otago cricketers
Cricketers from Dunedin